Cry of the Justice Bird is a 2007 novel written by Jon Haylett. It is an action/adventure thriller based in the fictional African state of Boromundi.

Plot summary
In an Africa ravaged by civil war, two women are pulled from a minibus, and are raped and mutilated. Armstrong MacKay, one of the dead women's lover, enters the country to bring her body home. During the festivities of her African wake, Mackay finds out the truth behind her violent death from the other woman's husband.
Faced with Africa's weaken government and the ineffective Boromundi legal system, the two men decide to take justice in their own hands and seek out the murders for themselves.
Kisasi, the Justice Bird, cries out as the men set out to execute the killers.

References

2007 British novels
Novels set in Africa
Novels about rape
Novels set in fictional countries